For the Children is a British television programme targeted at children of school age. First broadcast on the BBC Television Service in 1937 at 3pm as the opening programme for afternoon viewing (as television would generally be broadcast from 3pm to 4pm and then later, from 9pm to 10pm). For its first two years the series was ten minutes in length. Suspended in 1939 along with the rest of BBC Television for the duration of World War II, it returned on 9 June 1946, running on Sunday afternoons and expanded to twenty minutes in length.

The series featured a variety of different presenters and acts: story readings, puppet shows, songs. On Saturday 13 March 1937, George Queen's Pantomime Goose was shown in the For the Children slot, the opening programme before In Your Garden came on at 3:10pm. In October 1946 the "hugely popular" children's puppet Muffin the Mule made his television debut on the show, accompanied by his "friend" Annette Mills. The puppet's character was devised by the puppeteer Ann Hogarth.

For the Children was last broadcast in December 1952, when it was superseded by other BBC children's television programmes, including Watch with Mother.

References

Further reading

1937 in British television
1937 British television series debuts
1952 British television series endings
1930s British children's television series
1940s British children's television series
1950s British children's television series
BBC children's television shows
Children's education television series